Zygmunt Turkow (6 November 1896 – 20 January 1970) was a Polish actor, playwright, and director of Jewish origin from Warsaw, who became famous for roles in the pre-war Jewish films and stage plays in Yiddish. His brother, Jonas Turkow, was also a noted actor and stage manager.

Shortly after German invasion of Poland in 1939 he left Poland together with his second wife. In 1940 he settled in Brazil. In 1952 he moved to Israel.

Turkow produced works by Iso Szajewicz at the Nowości Theatre where he worked for many years.
He was the founder of several notable theatres, including the Central Theatre in 1921, co-founder of the Brazilian National Theatre in 1940 and the traveling Zuta Theatre in Tel Aviv, Israel in 1956, where he served as manager and director.

Zygmunt Turkow Theatre is named in his honor.

References

External links
Zygmunt Turkow on IMDb

Polish male stage actors
Male actors from Warsaw
1896 births
1970 deaths
Polish male film actors
Jewish Polish male actors
Polish male dramatists and playwrights
Writers from Warsaw
People from Warsaw Governorate
Jews from the Russian Empire
Polish emigrants to Brazil
Polish emigrants to Israel
20th-century Polish dramatists and playwrights
20th-century Polish male writers
Jewish emigrants from Nazi Germany to Brazil